Sébastien Peytavie (born 17 April 1982) is a French politician from Génération.s who has represented the 4th constituency of Dordogne in the National Assembly since 2022.

See also 

 List of deputies of the 16th National Assembly of France

References 

Living people
1982 births
Deputies of the 16th National Assembly of the French Fifth Republic
Génération.s politicians
21st-century French politicians
21st-century French women politicians
Women members of the National Assembly (France)
Members of Parliament for Dordogne